M. Park "Tink" Gillam was a college football, baseball, and basketball coach. He won back-to-back Southern Intercollegiate Athletic Association basketball titles as coach at Mercer, earning him the title "the Napoleon of Southern basketball". He then was head baseball coach at Clemson. At both, he was an assistant on the football team. He played as a halfback at Birmingham College. He was inducted into the Birmingham–Southern Sports Hall of Fame in 1990.

References

Mercer Bears men's basketball coaches
Clemson Tigers baseball coaches
Mercer Bears football coaches
Clemson Tigers football coaches
American football halfbacks
Birmingham–Southern Panthers football players
Birmingham–Southern Panthers baseball players
Birmingham–Southern Panthers men's basketball players